Pionir Ice Hall is an ice hall in sports complex "Pionir", the youngest of the sports facility within the sports and recreation center "Tašmajdan", and is designed for all sports on the ice. It is located in Belgrade, Serbia. It was opened on March 12, 1978, and has 2 000 seats and it was partially renovated in 2001.

The usable area of the hall is 6000 m2, and the ice area is 1800 m2. It is used for hockey games, figure skating competitions and recreational skating.During the building of the Hall, 21 km of pipes for freezing were installed under the concrete.

Events

Figure skating
September 22–25, 2001 - ISU Junior Grand Prix of Figure Skating-Belgrade Sparrow
September 12–15, 2002 - ISU Junior Grand Prix of Figure Skating-Belgrade Sparrow
January 9–12, 2008 - 1st Europa Cup Skate Helena
February 11–15, 2009 - 2nd Europa Cup Skate Helena
January 13–17, 2010 - 3rd Europa Cup Skate Helena
November 20, 2009 - 1st Ice Flower Cup
November, 2010 - 2nd Ice Flower Cup
April 17, 2010 - 6th Belgrade Trophy
January 12–16, 2011 - 4th Europa Cup Skate Helena
April 1, 2011 - 7th Belgrade Trophy
January 10–14, 2012 - 5th Europa Cup Skate Helena

Ice hockey
January 4–08, 2001 - 2001 IIHF World U20 Championship Division III
January 5–09, 2002 - 2002 IIHF World U20 Championship Division III

January 10–16, 2006 - 2006 IIHF World U20 Championship Division II Group B
January 16–24, 2008 - 2008 IIHF World U20 Championship Division III
 January 12–18, 2013 - 2013 IIHF Ice Hockey U20 World Championship Division II Group B
 March 9–15, 2013 - 2013 IIHF Ice Hockey U18 World Championship Division II Group B
 April 9–15, 2014 - 2014 IIHF Ice Hockey World Championship Division II Group A

See also
 Pionir Hall
 List of indoor arenas in Serbia

References

External links
 www.tasmajdan.rs
 www.iihf.com
 Serbian Skating Association

Indoor ice hockey venues in Serbia
Sports venues in Belgrade
Sports venues completed in 1978
1978 establishments in Serbia
Palilula, Belgrade